The 1879 Birthday Honours were appointments by Queen Victoria to various orders and honours to reward and highlight good works by citizens of the British Empire. The appointments were made to celebrate the official birthday of the Queen, and were published in The London Gazette on 24 May 1879.
   
The recipients of honours are displayed here as they were styled before their new honour, and arranged by honour, with classes (Knight, Knight Grand Cross, etc.) and then divisions (Military, Civil, etc.) as appropriate.

United Kingdom and British Empire

The Most Distinguished Order of Saint Michael and Saint George

Knight Grand Cross of the Order of St Michael and St George (GCMG)
The Right Honourable Lord Lyons  Her Majesty's Ambassador Extraordinary and Plenipotentiary to the French Republic
The Right Honourable Lord Odo William Leopold Russell  Her Majesty's Ambassador Extraordinary and Plenipotentiary to His Majesty the German Emperor, King of Prussia
Sir Antonio Micallef  President of the Court of Appeal in the Island of Malta

Knight Commander of the Order of St Michael and St George (KCMG)
Sir Narcisse-Fortunat Belleau  formerly Lieutenant-Governor of Quebec
William Taylour Thomson  late Her Majesty's Envoy Extraordinary and Minister Plenipotentiary to His Majesty the Shah of Persia
William Pearce Howland  formerly Lieutenant-Governor of the Province of Ontario
Charles Tupper  Minister of Public Works for the Dominion of. Canada
Samuel Leonard Tilley  Minister of Finance for the Dominion of Canada
George Buckley Mathew  late Her Majesty's Envoy Extraordinary and Minister-Plenipotentiary to His Majesty the Emperor of Brazil
George Welsh Kellner  late Financial Commissioner in Cyprus
Major-General Edward Wolstenholme Ward  late Deputy Master of the Branch Mint at Sydney
Dr. Ferdinand von Mueller  Government Botanist, Victoria
George Brown, Member of the Senate of the Dominion of Canada
Alexander Campbell, Receiver-General of the Dominion of Canada
Richard John Cartwright, lately Finance Minister of the Dominion of Canada
Edward William Stafford, formerly Prime Minister of New Zealand
William Fox, formerly Prime Minister of New Zealand

Honorary Knight Commander
His Excellency Rachad Pacha, late Governor of Gallipoli

Companion of the Order of St Michael and St George (CMG)
James Armstrong, Chief Justice of the Island of Saint Lucia
Colonel Henry Wray, Royal Engineers, lately Commanding Royal Engineers in Malta, and specially employed in directing the Drainage Works of Malta
Colonel Peter Henry Scratchley, Royal Engineers, specially employed in Superintending Works of Defence in the Australian Colonies
Lieutenant-Colonel John Terence Nicolls O'Brien, Inspector-General of Police, Mauritius
Major John Frederick Adolphus McNair  Colonial Engineer and Surveyor-General, Straits Settlements
Christopher Rolleston, Auditor-General of New South Wales
Edward Richardson, formerly Minister of Public Works, New Zealand
William James Mudie Larnach, lately Treasurer of New Zealand
Thomas Berkeley Hardtman-Berkeley, Member of the Executive Council of Saint Christopher and Vice-President of the Federal Council of the Leeward Islands
William Brandford Griffith, Auditor-General, Barbados
Patrick Jennings, Executive Commissioner for the Industrial Exhibition, New South Wales
Joseph Henderson, of Natal, selected as Commissioner to inquire into the Finances of the Transvaal
Hugh Low, British Resident at Perak, in the Malay Peninsula
George Bentham  of Victoria, author of the Flora Australiensis

References

Birthday Honours
1879 awards
1879 in Australia
1879 in the United Kingdom